Linanthus orcuttii is an uncommon species of flowering plant in the phlox family known by the common name Orcutt's linanthus. It is known only from southern California and Baja California, where it grows in chaparral and pine forests in the Peninsular Ranges and occasionally the San Bernardino Mountains.

Description
Linanthus orcuttii is a petite annual herb producing short, hairy stems no more than about 10 centimeters tall. The leaves are divided into hairy, needlelike lobes several millimeters long. The inflorescence is a small cluster of funnel-shaped flowers with thin, tubular throats opening into corollas barely over a centimeter wide. The flower may be white or shades of blue-purple to pink, with yellow and white throats streaked with tiny purple lines.

See also
California montane chaparral and woodlands

External links
Calflora Database: Linanthus orcuttii (Orcutt's linanthus)
Jepson Manual eFlora (TJM2) treatment of Linanthus orcuttii
UC Photos gallery — Linanthus orcuttii

orcuttii
Flora of California
Flora of Baja California
Natural history of the California chaparral and woodlands
Natural history of the Peninsular Ranges
~
Flora without expected TNC conservation status